Anne Buist is an Australian researcher and practising psychiatrist specializing in women's mental health, in particular postpartum psychiatric illnesses. She is also a novelist, author of the Natalie King crime fiction series, and co-author, with her husband Graeme Simsion, of the novels Two Steps Forward (2017) and Two Steps Onward (2021).

Education 
Buist has an M.B.B.S. from Monash University in 1981 and was admitted as a Fellow of the Royal Australian and New Zealand College of Psychiatrists in 1989. She has an MMed from the University of Melbourne for research into infants exposed to antidepressants in breastmilk in 1992, and an MD from the University of Melbourne in 1999 for her study of the long-term effects of childhood abuse.

Career 
From 1993 to 1997, Buist was Director of Psychiatry at the Mercy Hospital for Women, Melbourne. She was appointed Associate Professor at the University of Melbourne in 1997 and Professor - Director of Women's Mental Health in 2006. Buist has published over 100 peer-reviewed journal articles and is a past president of the Australasian Marcé Society for Perinatal Mental Health. She was director of the Beyondblue postnatal depression program from 2001 to 2005.

Writing 
Buist wrote ten novels and novellas of erotic fiction (published by Siren Bookstrand) under the pseudonym Simone Sinna, an anagram of her married name, Anne Simsion. She published her first mainstream crime novel, Medea’s Curse, in 2015 and a sequel Dangerous to Know in 2016. A third in the series, This I Would Kill For was published in January 2018. The novels feature protagonist Natalie King, a forensic psychiatrist with bipolar disorder. Medea's Curse was shortlisted for the Davitt Awards (Best Adult Novel and Best Debut Crime categories). Two Steps Forward, a novel co-authored with her husband Graeme Simsion, was published in 2017. In April 2020 her crime novel, The Long Shadow, was published by Text.

Medea’s Curse has been optioned by Causeway Films and Two Steps Forward by Fox Searchlight with Ellen DeGeneres' A Very Good Production to produce.

Personal life 
Buist has been married to novelist Graeme Simsion since 1989 and they have two children. In 2011, she and Simsion walked the Camino de Santiago de Compostela/ Chemin de St Jacques from central France. The journey inspired their joint novel Two Steps Forward.

References

Australian women psychiatrists
Australian women novelists
Living people
Year of birth missing (living people)